Cai Qiao or Chiao Tsai was a Chinese physiologist and physician. Cai is famous for his discovery in 1920s, the ventral tegmental area, which also known as the ventral tegmental area of Tsai. He was elected as a member of Academia Sinica in 1948, also a member of Chinese Academy of Sciences in 1955.

Early life and education 
Cai finished his psychological training in California University during 1919–21, then he entered University of Chicago as a postgraduate with Harvey A. Carr's guidance, he also focused on the subjects overlap psychology such as neuroanatomy and physiology during this period, and finally altered his research field towards the latter thenceforth.

Career 
Cai returned to China in 1925, and took a post of professor of physiology at Fudan University. He transferred to National Shanghai Medical College two years later. Then he edited the first textbook on physiology for undergraduate in Chinese, which was published in 1929.

Cai went to UK and Germany as a senior visit scholar within laboratory of C. Lovatt Evans, and later, Edgar Adrian during 1930–32. Cai continued his teaching and research in Shanghai, until the beginning of 1937, began to teach at School of Medicine, National Central University.

Cai moved to West China followed the university after the Marco Polo Bridge Incident. He backed to Nanjing since the war over, and appointed as deputy dean of the school in 1948.

After 1949, Cai joined PLA. Since the school moved to Xi'an, he went to Beijing and entered Academy of Military Medical Sciences (AMMS) in 1954 as vice president and chairman of Academic Council. From then on, he gradually laid the foundation of nautical physiology, aviation physiology and space physiology of China. He devoted to neurobiology later in life.

Cai served as the general director of Chinese Association for Physiological Sciences during 1964–81, then the honours general director until he died in 1990.

Although Cai was humiliated and once exiled to Hengshui, Hebei during the Cultural Revolution, he kept the research.

References 

1897 births
1990 deaths
Chinese physiologists
Educators from Guangdong
Academic staff of Fudan University
Members of Academia Sinica
Members of the Chinese Academy of Sciences
Academic staff of Nanjing University
Academic staff of the National Central University
People from Jieyang
Physicians from Guangdong
Scientists from Guangdong
University of California alumni
University of Chicago alumni
Victims of the Cultural Revolution